The 2016 Canadian Senior Curling Championships were held from March 28 to April 2 at the Digby Curling Club and the Digby Arena in Digby, Nova Scotia. The winners will represent Canada at the 2017 World Senior Curling Championships.

Men's

Teams
The teams are listed as follows:

Round-robin standings
Final round-robin standings

Championship Pool Standings
Final round-robin standings

Playoffs

Semifinals
Saturday, April 2, 9:30

Bronze-medal game
Saturday, April 2, 2:30 pm

Final
Saturday, April 2, 2:30 pm

Women

Teams
The teams are listed as follows:

Round-robin standings
Final round-robin standings

Championship Pool Standings
Final round-robin standings

Playoffs

Semifinals
Saturday, April 2, 9:30

Bronze-medal game
Saturday, April 2, 2:30 pm

Final
Saturday, April 2, 2:30 pm

References

External links

2016 in Canadian curling
Canadian Senior Curling Championships
Curling in Nova Scotia
2016 in Nova Scotia
Digby County, Nova Scotia